Aegialomys xanthaeolus, also known as the yellowish oryzomys or yellowish rice rat, is a species of rodent in the family Cricetidae. It belongs to the genus Aegialomys in tribe Oryzomyini, which was not recognized as distinct from Oryzomys until 2006. It is found in coastal Ecuador and Peru. Though it is currently the only formally recognized mainland species of Aegialomys, at least one other exists. The specific name is sometimes incorrectly spelled "xantheolus", without the second "a".

References

Literature cited

Weksler, M., Percequillo, A.R. and Voss, R.S. 2006. Ten new genera of oryzomyine rodents (Cricetidae: Sigmodontinae). American Museum Novitates 3537:1–29.
Zeballos, H. and Weksler, M. 2008. . In IUCN. IUCN Red List of Threatened Species. Version 2009.2. <www.iucnredlist.org>. Downloaded on November 25, 2009.

Aegialomys
Mammals described in 1894
Taxa named by Oldfield Thomas
Taxonomy articles created by Polbot